Jordan Anderson Racing Bommarito Autosport is an American professional stock car racing team that competes in the NASCAR Xfinity Series, fielding the No. 27 full-time for Jeb Burton and the No. 31 Chevrolet Camaro full-time for Parker Retzlaff and in the NASCAR Craftsman Truck Series, fielding the No. 3 Chevrolet Silverado part-time for  Jordan Anderson. The team has a technical alliance with Richard Childress Racing, who build their cars, and ECR Engines, who build their engines.

Xfinity Series

Car No. 27 & 32 history
Part Time (2022)
On August 1, 2022, when NASCAR released the entry list for the New Holland 250 at Michigan International Speedway, the No. 32 was included on the list with co-owner Jordan Anderson as the driver. Anderson failed to qualify due to a spin on his qualifying lap. Austin Wayne Self was tapped to drive the entry at Watkins Glen International a week later, failing to qualify for the race.

Jeb Burton (2023-Present)
On January 4, 2023, the No. 32 was renumbered to the No. 27, with Jeb Burton joining from Our Motorsports.

Car No. 31 history

Multiple Drivers (2021)
On January 25, 2021, it was announced that Jordan Anderson Racing would move up to the Xfinity Series full-time in the No. 31 car, with Anderson himself driving full-time and running for rookie of the year.

The team attempted to make their debut at the Beef. It's What's for Dinner. 300 at Daytona International Speedway in February 2021. Rain forced the cancelation of qualifying and due to NASCAR rainout rules, the car did not make the field due to not having any owner points and there being more than 40 cars in the field. With qualifying not being held again (due to the COVID-19 pandemic) until the race at Circuit of the Americas in May and more than 36 cars entering the races, the No. 31 was excluded from the field for the following nine races.

The team was finally able to qualify for a race when Tyler Reddick joined the team at Circuit of the Americas in which he was able to finish eighth and followed that up with a fifth-place finish at the Alsco Uniforms 300 the following week. Owner, Anderson, made his debut at the Alsco Uniforms 250 at Texas Motor Speedway, where he finished 34th.The team participated in every race in 2021 since they were able to qualify, finishing in the top ten six times with multiple drivers.

Myatt Snider (2022)
On November 3, 2021, it was confirmed that Myatt Snider would move from the No. 2 Richard Childress Racing car to the No. 31 in a full-time role in the 2022 NASCAR Xfinity Series. The cars will continue to be built by RCR and the engines supplied by ECR Engines. TaxSlayer was announced as the sponsor. During the 2022 season, Snider finished second at Portland. At Martinsville, Snider collided with Austin Hill during the closing laps. Following the race, Hill punched Snider in the face on pit road.

Parker Retzlaff (2023)
It was announced that Parker Retzlaff will drive the No. 31 full time for the 2023 season

Car No. 31 results

Camping World Truck Series

Truck No. 3 history

On January 31, 2018, Jordan Anderson announced that he will be fielding his team in the NASCAR Camping World Truck Series full-time in 2018. He chose the number 3 in honor of Junior Johnson. The team purchased the Brad Keselowski Racing's No. 29 owners points for them to secure every race in 2018. In the team's first race, at Daytona, Anderson drove the truck to a 9th-place finish, spinning on the last lap but avoiding hitting the wall and damaging his truck. On July 10, 2018, it was announced Ryan Newman would drive the No. 3 at Eldora. Newman would be placed in Heat #5 and finish second, being placed 10th on the grid. During the race, Newman would, unfortunately, be damaged in a wreck involving Tyler Dippel and Matt Crafton. He would get back on track but finish 30th. The team would go on top compile two Top 10 finishes in their inaugural season and finish 15th in the final 2018 Driver Point Standings.

In 2019, Anderson drove the No. 3 for all but one race, with the lone exception being the Eldora Dirt Derby with Carson Hocevar.

In 2020, Anderson finished 2nd in a thrilling finish with Grant Enfinger in the NextEra Energy 250. Also in that season, Anderson finished 6th at Talladega Superspeedway. Other than that, he had 6 other top 20 finishes.

In 2021, Anderson went part-time in the No. 3 to focus on his Xfinity Series program. He once again finished 2nd at Daytona in a photo finish, this time with Ben Rhodes. Bobby Reuse raced at the Daytona Road Course, finishing 27th. Dirt ringer J. R. Heffner joined the team for the Bristol Motor Speedway dirt race, but would withdraw following a crash in practice. Howie DiSavino III and Keith McGee would run races for the team as well.
Sprint Car racer Parker Price-Miller joined the team at Knoxville for the Corn Belt 150. Sage Karam, who debuted for the team at the Pennzoil 150, would make his debut at the United Rentals 200.

Following the 2022 Fr8Auctions 208, the team pulled out of the following race at Circuit of the Americas and announced a temporary pause in the truck program for at least the next three races. This marked the first time that the team didn’t run full-time.

Truck No. 3 results

Partnerships

Roper Racing No. 04
Jordan Anderson Racing used the owner points of the Roper Racing No. 04 at Mosport in 2019 for Roger Reuse in a one-off deal which also included his brother Bobby driving the No. 56 Hill truck.

Premium Motorsports No. 15
For the Iowa race in 2018, Jordan Anderson Racing fielded a second truck using the owner points from the Premium Motorsports No. 15 truck for Bobby Reuse. Reuse started 32nd and finished 25th after having suspension issues. Reuse was supposed to drive at Gateway but Bryant Barnhill drove the truck instead. Bryant made his debut at Gateway starting 28th and finished 31st after his engine blew up on lap 5. They used No. 15 owner's points to make both races.

Niece Motorsports No. 38
For the Eldora race in 2019, Anderson partnered with Niece Motorsports to jointly field Niece's No. 38 truck, which was driven by dirt racer Mark Smith, who made his NASCAR debut in this race.

CMI Motorsports No. 49
In 2020 and 2021, Anderson partnered with CMI Motorsports to jointly field CMI's No. 49 truck for Roger Reuse to drive at the Daytona Road Course. However, in 2021, qualifying was not held for the race, and due to there being over 40 trucks on the entry list and the No. 49 being too low in owner points, the entry was excluded from the field. Anderson would use the team's owner points again at Gateway in 2020 with Roger making his first NASCAR start on an oval.

Hill Motorsports No. 56
Jordan Anderson Racing used the owner points of the Hill Motorsports No. 56 at Mosport in 2019 for Bobby Reuse in a one-off deal which also included his brother Roger driving the No. 04 Roper truck. Anderson would use the team's owner points again at Phoenix, fielding the No. 56 for Carson Hocevar.

JJL Motorsports No. 97
Jordan Anderson Racing used JJL Motorsports' No. 97 owner points for Roger Reuse to drive at Mosport in 2018.

References

External links
 

2018 establishments in North Carolina
NASCAR teams